The British Families Education Service (BFES) was an organisation set up by the British Government in 1946 to run schools for the children of British military and government personnel serving in West Germany.

History
Prior to 1946, Army Education Corps was responsible for the training of teachers (Queen's Army Schoolmistresses) to teach soldiers' children at garrisons. With the end of World War II and the establishment of the British Army on the Rhine as part of the Allied occupation of Germany, personnel were allowed to bring their families over through "Operation Union". This presented a problem for the War Office as these children needed to attend school. BFES was established by the Foreign Office in cooperation with the War Office and Ministry of Education. The first school officially opened by the BFES was Prince Rupert School, then located at the coastal town of Wilhelmshaven. LEAs were asked to aid in the recruitment of teachers to the newly opened schools in Germany.
Two other boarding schools were open during the 1950s.  One at Hamm, and another (King Alfred's School) at Plon in Northern Germany.  This second school was originally a German naval cadet training centre.  During the period 1957–1959, it housed some 700 pupils - half boys, half girls - providing wonderful facilities. At the end of the school year in 1959, it was formally handed back to the German Navy.

Over the years, the BFES and its later incarnations opened schools at British Armed Forces bases around the world, such as in Hong Kong, Singapore, Cyprus, Malta, Gibraltar, Mauritius and Malaya.

Later years
During the early 1970s, BFES became the Service Children's Education Authority (SCEA), an agency overseen by the British Army. In 1989 it came under a new administration and was renamed Service Children's Schools (SCS) before adopting its current name Service Children's Education (SCE).

See also
 Service Children's Education

References

Defence agencies of the United Kingdom
Education in the United Kingdom
Education in Germany
International schools in Germany